Alphitophagus is a genus of beetles belonging to the family Tenebrionidae.

The genus was first described by Stephens in 1832.

The genus has almost cosmopolitan distribution.

Species:
 Alphitophagus bifasciatus (Say, 1824)

References

Tenebrionidae